Steve, Stephen or Steven Robinson may refer to:

Stephen E. Robinson (1948–2018), American Mormon scholar
Stephen Robinson (born 1955), American astronaut
Stephen Robinson (footballer) (born 1974), Northern Irish football player and coach
Stephen C. Robinson (born 1957), U.S. federal judge
Steve Robinson (basketball) (born 1957), American basketball coach
Steve Robinson (boxer) (born 1968), Welsh boxer
Steve Robinson (English footballer) (born 1975), English footballer
Steve Robinson (wrestler) (born 1975), American professional wrestler
Steve Robinson (bridge) (born 1941), American professional bridge player
Steven Robinson (film editor), Australian film editor
Steve Robinson (executive) (born 1946), American radio manager, producer and executive producer
Steve Robinson (rugby league) (born 1965), Australian rugby league player